The Great Yeongnam Road, or Yeongnamdaero, was one of the principal roads of Korea during the Joseon Dynasty, 1392-1910.  It ran between Hanseong (modern-day Seoul) and Dongnae (in modern-day Busan).  More generally, it served to connect the Gyeongsang province to the capital.  It takes its name from Yeongnam, an alternate name for the Gyeongsang region.  In addition to officials and merchants, the road was used by scholars from Gyeongsang on their way to and from the gwageo, national examinations held in the capital.

Much of the course of the road was destroyed in the course of the 20th century.  However, a few small stretches have been preserved.  The most notable of these is Mungyeong Saejae, where the road crossed the Sobaek Mountains.

See also
List of roads and highways
History of Korea

Roads in South Korea
Joseon dynasty